Xinxiang (postal: Sinsiang) is a prefecture-level city in northern Henan province, China.

It borders the provincial capital of Zhengzhou to its southwest, Kaifeng to its southeast, Hebi and Anyang to its north, Jiaozuo to its west, and the provinces of Shanxi and Shandong to its northwest and east respectively.

Its total population was 6,251,929 as of the 2020 Chinese Census. As of the 2018 estimation, 2,743,200 lived in the built-up (or metro) area made of 4 urban districts (Weibin, Hongqi, Muye, Fenquan), Yanjin county, Xinxiang county and Huixian City which are now being conurbated as the city is expanding very quickly.

History 
Xinxiang was site of the Battle of Muye where the Shang Dynasty was overthrown by the Zhou. Xinxiang dates from the Sui dynasty (581-618) and was a small market center before being developed as an industrial center in the 1950s. It also served as the capital of the short-lived Pingyuan Province, which covered neighbouring cities -Anyang, Hebi, Puyang, Jiaozuo and Heze, between 1949 and 1952, for the purpose of pacifying Nationalist guerillas through military action and accepting surrender.

Geography

Climate

Pollution 
According to a 2015 report by Greenpeace, Henan (Xinxiang's province) has the most severe air pollution of all the provinces in China, with an average PM2.5 concentration of 103.3 μg/m3 (micrograms per cubic meter). The report found that Xinxiang has the 13th most polluted city air in China, with a PM2.5 concentration of 114.6 μg/m3 (over 11 times the safe limit established by the WHO) during the first quarter of 2015. Swiss firm IQAir reported that Xinxiang suffered from an average PM2.5 concentration of 51.5 μg/m3 in 2020, ranking 31st in China, and 89th in the world.

In 2015, environmental non-governmental organization Airman purchased wheat samples farmed in the town of Wangcun, in Xinxiang, near a battery factory, and found it had cadmium levels up to 17 times the national safe limit. Following this report, the Xinxiang municipal government launched a program to purchase contaminated wheat, and convert the farmland to other purposes. However, again in 2017, the group purchased additional wheat samples, and found them to have cadmium levels up to 18 times the national limit, with all samples purchased exceeding national safety limits. In response, government officials from the town of Dakuai met with the group, and pledged to further investigate the samples and stop growing wheat on contaminated farmland.

Religion 
Xinjiang Roman Catholics are served by the Apostolic Prefecture of Xinxiang, which was established on July 7, 1936, on missionary territory split off from the then Apostolic Vicariate of Weihuifu (now Diocese of Jixian). It is a pre-diocesan jurisdiction, which is exempt (i.e., directly subject to the Holy See and its missionary Roman Congregation for the Evangelization of Peoples), and not part of any ecclesiastical province.

It has had the following incumbent Apostolic Prefects of Xinxiang (Roman Rite) :
 Father Thomas Megan, Divine Word Missionaries S.V.D.) (born USA) (1936.07.07 – retired 1948), died 1951
 Fr. Johannes Schütte, S.V.D. (born Germany) (1948 – death 1971.11.18), also Superior General of Society of the Divine Word (Divine Word Missionaries) (1958.03.28 – 1967.12.15) and Vice-Secretary of Pontifical Commission of Justice and Peace (1968–1971.11.18)
 Joseph Zhang Wei-zhu (first Chinese and secular priest) (1992, with clandestine episcopal consecration)

Military 

Xinxiang is the headquarters of the 83rd Group Army of the People's Liberation Army, one of the three group armies that comprise the Jinan Military Region responsible for defence of the Yellow River plain.

Administration 

The prefecture-level city administers 4 districts, 3 county-level cities and 5 counties.

District:
Weibin District
Hongqi District
Muye District
Fengquan District
County-level city:
Huixian City
Weihui City
Changyuan City
County:
Xinxiang County
Huojia County
Yuanyang County
Yanjin County
Fengqiu County

Economy 
Frestech, a major home appliance company, was located in Xinxiang prior to its liquidation in 2018. One of the business units spun off in Frestech's dissolution, Xinfei Electric Group, continues to operate in Xinxiang. Xinfei Electric Group, now a wholly-owned subsidy of Aviation Industry Corporation of China, produces refrigerated trucks, military vehicles, RVs, modular building structures, precision equipment, refrigerators, air conditioners, and environmental control equipment.

Other important enterprises located in Xinxiang include Golden Dragon Copper Group, Bailu Chemical Fibre, Henan Kelong Group, and AVIC XINHANG Industry Corporation.

Agriculture and textiles 
Textiles and processed food are also major products of Xinxiang. As an old textiles base, the cotton industry is very developed in Xinxiang.

Transport 

The city is a rail junction and industrial centre at the head of navigation on the Wei River. The river, made navigable for small vessels by river improvements in the 1950s, links the city with Tianjin, the main port for Beijing. Later, due to heavy industrial chemical pollution, the river course had been totally cut off and got filled up. After recent dredges, it is still no more than a man-made lake.

Rail
Xinxiang is located at the junction of the Beijing-Guangzhou, Xinxiang-Yueshan and the Xinxiang-Yanzhou Railways.

Xinxiang has two railway stations: Xinxiang Railway Station and Xinxiang East Railway Station.

Education 

There are several universities and colleges located in the prefecture-level city.
Henan Normal University
: newly combined university located in the eastern part of Xinxiang, it has 21 faculties and 3 centers
Henan Institute of Science and Technology
Xinxiang Medical University
Henan Mechanical and Electrical Engineering College
Xinxiang Hygiene School

Sister city 

  Kashiwara, Osaka, Japan

See also 
 History of the political divisions of China
 List of Catholic dioceses in China
 List of twin towns and sister cities in China
 Air pollution in China
 Soil contamination in China

References

Sources and external links 

 Government website of Xinxiang  
 GCatholic - apostolic prefecture
 Window on Xinxiang 
 Xinxiang University 

 
Populated places established in the 1st millennium
Cities in Henan
Contaminated farmland
Prefecture-level divisions of Henan
National Forest Cities in China